M-256 was a Project 615 (NATO: "Quebec-class") short-range, diesel attack submarine of the Soviet Navy. She was commissioned into the Baltic Fleet.

Design
Project 615 submarines were fitted with two regular diesel engines and a third, closed-cycle diesel engine, which used liquid oxygen (LOX) to provide air-independent propulsion while the submarine was submerged. This system produced remarkable submerged speed and range, but greatly increased the hazard of a fire. Project 615 submarines were referred to by their crews as "matchsticks."

Sinking
On 26 September 1957, while operating in gale conditions in the Gulf of Finland of the Baltic Sea, one of M-256’s diesel engines exploded.  Fire immediately engulfed the diesel compartment, and soon spread to the next compartment. The boat surfaced and because of the likelihood of further explosions her crew evacuated onto her weather deck.  None of the four ships keeping station nearby were able to take her under tow or evacuate her crew because of the gale conditions.  About four hours after the beginning of the fire the boat suddenly lost longitudinal stability, took on a steep down-bubble, and sank.  Of the 35 men on the boat's deck, only seven were rescued.

References 

 Книга памяти - M-256 

Quebec-class submarines
Ships built in the Soviet Union
1953 ships
Cold War submarines of the Soviet Union
Maritime incidents in 1957
Lost submarines of the Soviet Union
1957 in the Soviet Union
Shipwrecks in the Gulf of Finland